Claes Västerteg (born 1972) is a Swedish Centre Party politician, member of the Riksdag from 2002 to 2010.

References

1972 births
Living people
Members of the Riksdag from the Centre Party (Sweden)
Members of the Riksdag 2002–2006
Members of the Riksdag 2006–2010
21st-century Swedish politicians